Mount Turner, also known as Boundary Peak 162, is an 8,661+ foot (2,640+ meter) glaciated mountain summit located in the Fairweather Range of the Saint Elias Mountains, on the Canada–United States border between southeast Alaska and British Columbia. Turner is the highest point on the divide which separates Ferris Glacier from Margerie Glacier. The mountain's name was officially adopted by the Geographical Names Board of Canada on March 31, 1924. The mountain was named for George Turner (1850–1932), one of the US members of the 1903 Alaska Boundary Tribunal.

Climate

Based on the Köppen climate classification, Mount Turner has a subarctic climate with cold, snowy winters, and mild summers. Temperatures can drop below −20 °C with wind chill factors below −30 °C. This climate supports small hanging glaciers on its slopes as well as the larger Margerie Glacier to the south and Ferris Glacier to the north. Precipitation runoff and meltwater from its glaciers drains into Glacier Bay Basin.

See also

List of Boundary Peaks of the Alaska–British Columbia/Yukon border
Geography of Alaska
Geography of British Columbia

References

Mountains of Glacier Bay National Park and Preserve
Saint Elias Mountains
Landforms of Hoonah–Angoon Census Area, Alaska
Two-thousanders of British Columbia
Mountains of Alaska
North American 2000 m summits